Max Everitt Rosenbloom (November 6, 1906 – March 6, 1976) was an American professional boxer, actor, and television personality. Nicknamed "Slapsie Maxie", he was inducted into The Ring's Boxing Hall of Fame in 1972, the International Jewish Sports Hall of Fame in 1984, the World Boxing Hall of Fame in 1985, and the International Boxing Hall of Fame in 1993. He was sometimes billed as Slapsie Maxie Rosenbloom for film appearances.

Early life and boxing career
Born in Leonard Bridge, Connecticut, Rosenbloom was nicknamed "Slapsie Maxie" by a journalist due to his open-gloved style of boxing. As a professional boxer, Rosenbloom relied on hitting and moving to score points. He was very difficult to hit cleanly with a power punch and his fights often went the full number of required rounds.  In his boxing career, he received thousands of punches to the head, which eventually led to the deterioration of his motor functions.

Legendary trainer Cus D'Amato later recalled that watching Rosenbloom's ring performances inspired him for a quest to create a perfect fighter, and to develop a unique boxing technique, later known as the peek-a-boo style: Rosenbloom was probably the cleverest fighter I've ever seen, defensively. You just couldn't hit the man. He developed a sort of a radar, a sense of anticipation of blows, and ability to react to that, and act on it.

Light Heavyweight Champion
On June 25, 1930, Rosenbloom won the NYSAC and vacant Ring Magazine light heavyweight titles when he faced off against Jimmy Slattery at Bison Stadium for the undisputed title. Slattery, being the reigning NYSAC champion and Rosenbloom being listed by some sources as the incumbent NBA light heavyweight champion. Since the fight was between the number one and number two fighters in the division, the vacant The Ring light heavyweight title was also on the line. He reigned as the NYSAC and Ring magazine champion until he was defeated by Bob Olin on November 16, 1934. Throughout his reign, he made 7 defenses of his titles and held the undisputed crown two separate times as he had been stripped by the National Boxing Association, a title which he was awarded outside of the ring on in September 1930 during the NBA's yearly meeting. On June 6, 1931, Rosenbloom was stripped, for failing to defend the title in a timely manner. After being stripped in 1931, he went on to continue defending his NYSAC and Ring titles, eventually defeating Bob Godwin via fourth-round technical knockout in Madison Square Garden on March 24, 1933. His second reign as the undisputed champion was just as short lived.  He was subsequently stripped by the National Boxing Association on September 17, 1934, during their annual meeting. "The delegates ruled that Maxie Rosenbloom, generally recognized as champion of the class, had violated every law of boxing by his slapping and flicking tactics in the ring."

Films, radio and television
In 1937, two years before he announced his permanent retirement from boxing, Rosenbloom accepted a role in a Hollywood film. He became a character actor, usually portraying comical or sympathetic "big guys" in movies such as Each Dawn I Die starring James Cagney and George Raft. He continued acting in films as well as on radio and television, where he again portrayed big, clumsy, often punch-drunk-but-lovable characters.

He appeared as himself in a number of radio episodes of The Fred Allen Show, including in a skit with Marlene Dietrich. He was also cast in an important part in television's first 90-minute drama, Requiem for a Heavyweight. Written by Rod Serling and starring Jack Palance, Keenan Wynn and Ed Wynn, that teleplay presents the story of a boxer at the end of his career. Rosenbloom portrays a character whose life revolves around his retelling old boxing stories night after night to other ex-boxers who gather in a down-and-out bar. That life looms as the same fate for "Mountain" McClintock (Palance's character) if he cannot adjust to a new way of life outside the ring.

Slapsy Maxie's, Rosenbloom's nightclub, is prominently featured in a 2013 crime film, Gangster Squad, which is set in 1949. The original club operated in San Francisco. The club moved to 7165 Beverly Blvd in Los Angeles. From 1943 to 1947 it was located at 5665 Wilshire Blvd.

Death
Rosenbloom, at age 69, died of Paget's disease of bone on March 6, 1976, at the Braewood Convalescent Hospital in South Pasadena, California. His gravesite is at the Valhalla Memorial Park Cemetery in North Hollywood, California.

Accolades
 The Ring Boxing Hall of Fame (1972)
 International Jewish Sports Hall of Fame (1984)  
 World Boxing Hall of Fame (1985)
 International Boxing Hall of Fame (1993)

Selected filmography

 Mr. Broadway (1933) – 'Slapsy' Maxie
 King for a Night (1933) – Maxie
 Muss 'em Up (1936) – Snake
 Kelly the Second (1936) – Butch Flynn
 Two Wise Maids (1937) – Max Handler, Champ
 Marry the Girl (1937) – Boxer (uncredited)
 Big City (1937) – Himself
 Nothing Sacred (1937) – Max Levinsky
 The Kid Comes Back (1938) – Stan Wilson
 Mr. Moto's Gamble (1938) – Horace Wellington
 Gangs of New York (1938) – Tombstone
 The Amazing Dr. Clitterhouse (1938) – Butch
 The Crowd Roars (1938) – Himself (uncredited)
 Submarine Patrol (1938) – Marine Sentry Sgt. Joe Duffy
 His Exciting Night (1938) – 'Doc' McCoy
 Slapsie Maxie's (1939, short) – Himself
 Women in the Wind (1939) – Stuffy McInnes
 The Kid from Kokomo (1939) – Curley Bender
 Naughty but Nice (1939) – Killer
 Each Dawn I Die (1939) – Fargo Red
 20,000 Men a Year (1939) – Walt Dorgan
 Private Detective (1939) – Brody
 Grandpa Goes to Town (1940) – Al
 Passport to Alcatraz (1940) – Hank Kircher
 Public Deb No. 1 (1940) – Eric
 The Lady and the Lug (1940, Short) – Himself
 Ringside Maisie (1941) – Chotsie
 The Stork Pays Off (1941) – 'Brains' Moran
 Harvard, Here I Come! (1941) – Maxie
 Louisiana Purchase (1941) – The Shadow aka Wilson
 Slick Chick (1941)
 To the Shores of Tripoli (1942) – Okay Jones
 Smart Alecks (1942) – Butch Brocalli
 The Boogie Man Will Get You (1942) – Maxie – the Powder Puff Salesman
 The Yanks Are Coming (1942) – Butch
 My Son, the Hero (1943) – Kid Slug Rosenthal
 Here Comes Kelly (1943) – Trixie Bell
 Swing Fever (1943) – 'Rags'
 Follow the Boys (1944) – Himself
 Allergic to Love (1944) – Max
 Three of a Kind (1944) – Maxie
 Irish Eyes Are Smiling (1944) – Stanley Ketchel
 Crazy Knights (1944) – Maxie
 Night Club Girl (1945) – Percival J. Percival
 Trouble Chasers (1945) – Maxie
 Penthouse Rhythm (1945) – Health Spa Proprietor
 Men in Her Diary (1945) – Moxie Kildorff
 The Perils of Pauline (1947) – Maxie (uncredited)
 Hazard (1948) – Truck Driver
 Mr. Universe (1951) – Big Ears, the Trainer
 Skipalong Rosenbloom (1951) – Skipalong Rosenbloom
 Abbott and Costello Meet the Keystone Kops (1955) – Hinds
 Requiem for a Heavyweight (1956, TV Series) – Steve
 Hollywood or Bust (1956) – Bookie Benny
 I Married a Monster from Outer Space (1958) – Max Grady – Bartender
 The Beat Generation (1959) – The Wrestling Beatnik
 The Bellboy (1960) – Maxie – Gangster
 Two Guys Abroad (1962) – Nightclub co-owner
 Don't Worry, We'll Think of a Title (1966) – Foreign Agent (scenes deleted)
 The Spy in the Green Hat (1967) – 'Crunch' Battaglia
 Cottonpickin' Chickenpickers (1967) – Maxie the Mailman
 My Side of the Mountain (1969) – Flint Seller (final film role)

Professional boxing record
All information in this section is derived from BoxRec, unless otherwise stated.

Official record

All newspaper decisions are officially regarded as "no decision" bouts and are not counted in the win/loss/draw column.

Unofficial record

Record with the inclusion of newspaper decisions in the win/loss/draw column.

See also
List of light heavyweight boxing champions
List of select Jewish boxers

References

External links

Slapsy Maxie on Vinyl
Harry Greb website
Hebrew University
Cyber Boxing Zone bio and record

|-

|-

https://www.hugmansworldchampionshipboxing.com/light-heavy
https://boxrec.com/media/index.php/The_Ring_Magazine%27s_Annual_Ratings:_Light_Heavyweight--1930s
https://boxrec.com/media/index.php/National_Boxing_Association%27s_Quarterly_Ratings:_1930
https://boxrec.com/media/index.php/National_Boxing_Association%27s_Quarterly_Ratings:_1931
https://boxrec.com/media/index.php/National_Boxing_Association%27s_Quarterly_Ratings:_1932
https://boxrec.com/media/index.php/National_Boxing_Association%27s_Quarterly_Ratings:_1933
https://boxrec.com/media/index.php/National_Boxing_Association%27s_Quarterly_Ratings:_1934

1907 births
1976 deaths
Boxers from Connecticut
American male film actors
American male television actors
Burials at Valhalla Memorial Park Cemetery
Jewish American boxers
Jewish boxers
Boxers from New York City
World boxing champions
World light-heavyweight boxing champions
20th-century American male actors
American male boxers
20th-century American Jews